Smiler(s) may refer to:

Characters
 "Smiler" Grogan, from the 1963 film It's a Mad, Mad, Mad, Mad World
 Clem "Smiler" Hemmingway, from the British sitcom Last of the Summer Wine
 The Smiler, from the comics series Transmetropolitan
 Smiler, main antagonist of The Emoji Movie

Music
 Smiler (musician), a British rapper
 Smiler (album), an album by Rod Stewart
 Smilers, an Estonian rock band named for Stewart's album
 Smiler, a 1970s UK band whose members included Iron Maiden founder Steve Harris

Other uses
 Smilers sheet, Britain's first personalised postage stamp sheet, issued in 2000
 The Smiler, a ride at Alton Towers, England.
 Smiler, a strip in the British comic Whoopee!
 Smiler, nickname for fans of singer-songwriter Miley Cyrus

See also
 Smile (disambiguation)
 Smiley (disambiguation)